Chūyō (冲鷹, "hawk which soars") was a Taiyō-class escort carrier originally built as , the first of her class of three passenger-cargo liners built in Japan during the late 1930s. She was requisitioned by the Imperial Japanese Navy (IJN) in late 1941 and was converted into an escort carrier in 1942. She spent most of her service ferrying aircraft, cargo and passengers to Truk until she was torpedoed and sunk by an American submarine in late 1943 with heavy loss of life.

Civilian service

Nitta Maru was the lead ship of her class and was built by Mitsubishi Shipbuilding & Engineering Co. at their Nagasaki shipyard for Nippon Yusen Kaisha (NYK). She was laid down on 9 May 1938 as yard number 750, launched on 20 May 1939 and completed on 23 March 1940. The IJN subsidized all three Nitta Maru-class ships for possible conversion into auxiliary aircraft carriers. The ships were intended to upgrade NYK's passenger service to Europe and it was reported that Nitta Maru was the first ship to be fully air conditioned in the passenger quarters. The ships had accommodation for 285 passengers (127 first class, 88 second and 70 third). The start of World War II in September 1939 restricted them to the Pacific and they served on the San Francisco run until the Japanese Government declared a ban on all voyages to the United States in August 1941.

She had a net tonnage of 9,397 and a cargo capacity of 11,800 tons. The ship was powered by two sets of geared steam turbines made by the shipbuilder, each driving one propeller shaft, using steam produced by four water-tube boilers.

Purchase by the navy and conversion
The ship was requisitioned for use as a military transport in February 1941. She made a few voyages, including one transferring roughly 1,200 American prisoners of war from Wake Island to Japan in January 1942. The ship departed on 12 January, arriving in Yokohama six days later. After unloading 20 men there, she departed for China. En route, the Japanese commander of the guard contingent, Lieutenant Toshio Sato, picked five men at random and ordered them topside. There they were ordered to kneel and he told them in Japanese: "You have killed many Japanese soldiers in battle. For what you have done you are now going to be killed ... as representatives of American soldiers." The Japanese then beheaded them. The bodies were used for bayonet practice and then thrown overboard.

The conversion took place in Kure Naval Arsenal between 1 July and 25 November 1942 and the ship was renamed Chūyō on 31 August. Chūyō could accommodate a total of 30 aircraft, including spares.

Chūyōs crew numbered 850 officers and ratings.

The ship was equipped with eight 40-caliber  Type 89 dual-purpose guns in four twin mounts on sponsons along the sides of the hull. Her light AA consisted of eight license-built  Type 96 light anti-aircraft (AA) guns in four twin-gun mounts, also in sponsons along the sides of the hull. In early 1943, the four twin 25 mm mounts were replaced by triple mounts and additional 25 mm guns were added.  Chūyō had a total of 22 guns plus 5 license-built  Type 93 anti-aircraft machineguns. The ships also received a Type 13 air search radar in a retractable installation on the flight deck at that time.

Operational history
The slow speed and lack of arresting gear prevented the Taiyōs from supporting the main fleet as the IJN had intended. They were thus relegated to secondary roles; Chūyō was used primarily as an aircraft transport to and from the naval base at Truk. She made the first of her 13 trips on 12 December 1942 and was back in Yokosuka two weeks later. She made about one trip per month in 1943 and the first eventful voyage was in April. Together with her sister Taiyō and the heavy cruiser , and escorted by six destroyers, Chūyō departed Yokosuka on 4 April and made a brief stopover at the island of Saipan three days later. On 9 April, the carrier was attacked by the submarine , but the detonators for the Mark 14 torpedoes were defective, causing them either to detonate early or not to detonate at all, denting Chūyōs hull.

The ship made four more trips between April and August, accompanied by her sister ship  each time, before she was given a brief refit between 9 and 18 August. The next voyage began on 7 September, this time with Taiyō in company. With one of Taiyōs propeller shafts damaged, Chūyō had to tow her for two days before they reached Yokosuka. Although she was transferred to the Combined Fleet on 27 September and then to the Grand Escort Command on 15 November, it made no appreciable difference to her duties as the ship continued to ferry aircraft to Truk.

On 30 November, the carrier departed Truk in company with the light carrier  and her sister Un'yō; the carriers were escorted by the heavy cruiser  and four destroyers. Chūyō and Un'yō had aboard 21 and 20 captured crewmen from the sunken submarine , respectively. The detonation blew off her bow and caused the forward part of the flight deck to collapse. To reduce pressure on the interior bulkheads, the ship's captain began steaming in reverse at half speed towards Yokosuka. The hits disabled her engines and Maya and one destroyer came alongside to render assistance. Sailfish attacked again at 08:42 and hit the carrier with one or two torpedoes on the port side. The hits caused massive flooding and Chūyō capsized very quickly to port six minutes later. There were very few survivors because of the speed at which she sank. Only 161 crewmen and passengers were saved, including one American prisoner of war; 737 passengers and 513 crewmen were lost. She was stricken from the Navy Directory on 5 February 1944.

Notable passengers
 Itaru Tachibana (spy) - Boarded on 21 June 1941 from San Francisco to Japan, forced to leave the U.S. due to being accused of espionage.

See also
 List by death toll of ships sunk by submarines

Notes

Footnotes

References

External links
 Imperial Japanese Navy Page

Taiyō-class escort carriers
Chūyō
1939 ships
World War II escort carriers of Japan
Ships sunk by American submarines
World War II shipwrecks in the Philippine Sea
Maritime incidents in December 1943